When a Man Rides Alone is a Western film released in 1933. Tom Tyler stars along with Adele Lacy, and Al Bridge. It was directed by J.P. McGowan.

Plot
A mysterious bandit called the Llano Kid robs stagecoaches but only takes money from Montana Slade's Cottonwood Mine. Striking from behind so he is not seen, the Kid gives the money to those cheated by Slade. 

Ruth Davis, a new schoolteacher decides to find out who the bandit it.

References

External links

1933 Western (genre) films
1933 films
American Western (genre) films
American black-and-white films
Films directed by J. P. McGowan
1930s English-language films
1930s American films